Alqama, Alkama, ʿAlqama or ʿAlḳama may refer to:

'Alqama ibn 'Abada (fl. early 6th century), Arab poet
Alqama ibn Qays (d. 681/2), Muslim scholar
Alqama (8th century), Muslim general

See also
Ibn Alqama (disambiguation)